Both men's and women's softball tournaments were conducted during World Games I. The games were played July 30 - August 2, 1981 at Central Park in Santa Clara, California. Teams from the United States, Canada, the Bahamas and Chinese Taipei participated in the women's event, while in the men's event, the United States, Canada, the Bahamas and Mexico were initially slated to appear. As the time of the Games approached, the Mexican team withdrew for financial reasons and was replaced by a second team from the United States.

All three U.S. teams were intact successful high-level softball teams, well known in the U.S. softball community.  The Raybestos Brakettes club from Connecticut was the women's team.  United States I, the original selection for the Games, was the Peterbilt team from Seattle, Washington.  After Mexico's decision, the Guanella Brothers team from Santa Rosa, California was engaged in the role of United States II.

Kathy Arendsen pitched four shutouts for the U.S. women, culminating in a perfect game in the championship final.

Women

Medalists

Standing
Round-robin phase:

Details
Each team played two games per day for three days, followed by a championship game between the top two teams in the standing.

Thursday, July 30, 1981:

Canada 4, Bahamas 3United States 1, Chinese Taipei 0United States 4, Bahamas ?Chinese Taipei d. Canada

Friday, July 31, 1981:

Bahamas 5, Chinese Taipei 2United States 3, Canada 0Canada 2, Bahamas 1United States 2, Chinese Taipei 0

Saturday, August 1, 1981:

Canada 2, Chinese Taipei 1United States d. BahamasUnited States 8, Canada 0Bahamas d. Chinese Taipei

Sunday, August 2, 1981:

Championship game -- United States 3, Canada 0 (perfect game by Arendsen)

Other known individual participants:  TPE – Feng-Yuan, Lih-Ju, Sub-Shain

Men

Medalists

Standing
Round-robin phase:

Details
Each team played two games per day for three days, followed by a championship game between the top two teams in the standing.

Thursday, July 30, 1981:

United States II 3, Bahamas 0United States I 2, Canada 1United States I 8, Bahamas 0United States II vs. Canada

Friday, July 31, 1981:

Canada 4, Bahamas 3 (9 inn.)United States I 3, United States II 1United States II 3, Bahamas 1United States I 4, Canada 3 (10 inn.)

Saturday, August 1, 1981:

United States I 5, Bahamas 1United States II vs. CanadaUnited States II 3, United States I 1Canada d. Bahamas

Note: Canada and United States II split the two games between them.

Sunday, August 2, 1981:

Championship game -- United States II 3, United States I 0

Other known individual participants:  BAH – Bethel, Butler, Clarke, Ford,  Russell, D Smith

References

1981
1981 World Games
1981 in softball
1981